Rattihalli  is a new taluk in the southern state of Karnataka, India. It is located in the Haveri district in Karnataka.  It is around 26 km from Ranebennur and around 16 km from Hirekerur.
The Veerabhadreshwara Car festival is very famous in Rattihalli.

History
Rattihalli was popular during the rule of Kadambas of Banavasi and Rashtrakuta. 
Earlier Rattihalli was called as Rashtrapalli by Rashtrakuta.

17th century later Haidar Ali (Mysore) captured Rattihalli with the help of Fazallula. Later Peshwa Madhav Rao captured. The war was called as Rattihalli Anvatti War.

Demographics
 India census, Rattihalli had a population of 11702 with 6056 males and 5646 females.

See also
 Ranebennur
 Haveri
 Districts of Karnataka

References

External links
 http://Haveri.nic.in/

Villages in Haveri district